The Sixth Goa Assembly (term : 2012-2017) was the unicameral legislature of the state of Goa in western India. It consists of 40 members. In charge of the budget, the Assembly appropriates money for social programs, agricultural development, infrastructure development, etc. It is also responsible for proposing and levying taxes.

The Assembly met in the Goa State Legislative Assembly Complex in Porvorim, Bardez.

Leaders

Goa Assembly Name

Composition

|-
! scope="col" style="background-color:#E9E9E9;text-align:left;" |Party
! scope="col" style="background-color:#E9E9E9;text-align:right;" |Seats
|- style="background: #90EE90;"
! scope="row" style="text-align:left;" |Bhartiya Janata Party
| 21
|- style="background: #90EE90;"
! scope="row" style="text-align:left;" |Maharashtrawadi Gomantak
| 3
|-
! scope="row" style="text-align:left;" |Indian National Congress
| 9
|-
! scope="row" style="text-align:left;" |Goa Vikas Party 
| 2
|-
! scope="row" style="text-align:left;" |Independents 
| 5
|- style="background-color:#E9E9E9; font-weight:bold"
! scope="row" style="text-align:left;" |Total
| 40
|}

Members
The following is the list of MLAs in the Sixth Goa Legislative Assembly after the 2012 election.

By-election
After the death of incumbent MLA of Cortalim Matanhy Saldanha, his wife Alina Saldanha was elected unopposed from Cortalim on 25 May. Other candidates withdrew from the contest. She was given her husband's ministerial portfolio as forest minister.

References

External links
Goa Legislature official site

6
6